Christmas: A Season of Love is the second Christmas album by American singer and actress Idina Menzel. It was released through School Boy and Decca Records on October 18, 2019, and includes duets with Billy Porter, Menzel's Frozen costar Josh Gad, Ariana Grande and Menzel's husband Aaron Lohr. Menzel's duet with Grande, "A Hand for Mrs. Claus", is an original song by the composers of the Frozen soundtrack, Kristen Anderson-Lopez and Robert Lopez, while Menzel wrote the original song "At This Table" with Jonas Myrin about "inclusion during the holiday season". The album also features a solo recording of the Rent song "Seasons of Love", and the Hanukkah song "Ocho Kandelikas", which is sung in Ladino. In promotion for the album, Menzel has embarked on a three-city concert tour set mainly on the East Coast, including a stop at New York City's Carnegie Hall.

Track listing

Personnel
Idina Menzel – lead vocals
Walter Afanasieff – production, arrangements, keyboards
Rob Mounsey – production
William Ross – arrangements
Jorge Calandrelli – arrangements
Dave Metzger – arrangement of "A Hand for Mrs. Claus"
David Reitzas – mixing
Nathan East – bass guitar
Vinnie Colaiuta – drums
Paul Jackson Jr. – guitar
Dennis Budimir – guitar
Randy Waldman – piano
Kenny G – saxophone
Kent Smith – trumpet solo
Josh Gad – vocal duet
Ariana Grande – vocal duet
Aaron Lohr – vocal duet
Billy Porter – vocal duet
Missi Hale – backing vocals
Luke Edgemon – backing vocals
Monét Owens – backing vocals
Tyler Gordon – engineering, programming
David Reitzas – engineering
Adrian Bradford – engineering
Tommy Vicari – orchestral engineering
Larry Mah – orchestral engineering
Courtney Blooding – production coordination
Norman Wonderly – creative direction
Ruven Afandor – photography

Charts

References

2019 Christmas albums
Albums produced by Ron Fair
Christmas albums by American artists
Idina Menzel albums
Pop Christmas albums
Schoolboy Records albums